India competed at the 1998 Winter Olympics in Nagano, Japan.  The nation returned to the Winter Games after missing the 1994 Winter Olympics.

India's only competing athlete was Men's Singles Luge competitor 16-year-old Shiva Keshavan.

Luge

Men

References 
 Official Olympic Reports
 Olympics-Reference.com

External links 
 Teen-Age Luger Carries All of India, 3 February 1998, The New York Times

Nations at the 1998 Winter Olympics
1998